Robert S. Spalding III (born 1966) is a retired United States Air Force brigadier general. He currently serves as a senior fellow at the Hudson Institute. His work focuses on U.S.–China relations, economic and national security, and the Asia-Pacific military balance.

Education 
Spalding earned a B.Sc. degree and M.Sc. degree in Agricultural Business, Fresno State University, Fresno, California in 1987 and 1993, followed by a Ph.D. in Economics and Mathematics from University of Missouri, Kansas City in 2007 and a second M.Sc. in Strategic Studies from Maxwell Air Force Base, Alabama in 2008.

Career 
He was promoted to brigadier general in November 2016. From December 2016 to May 2017, he was U.S. Senior Defense Official and Defense Attaché to China, Beijing and from May 2017 to January 2018, Senior Director for Strategic Planning, National Security Council, White House, Washington D.C.

While at the National Security Council, Spalding notably wrote a memo calling for nationalizing the development of 5G wireless network. Spalding's advocacy was reportedly deemed outside his authority and he was subsequently asked to leave the NSC. He has since been notable as a critic of China.

Spalding served as a board member of We Build A Wall, the fundraising group that saw four of its members, including former President Trump's Advisor Steve Bannon, indicted on fraud charges on August 20, 2020, “I would like to wait and see what happens. It is the case that we’re presumed innocent until proven guilty,” Spalding told the Guardian when allegations of fraud surfaces. “If it is proven true of course I would be disappointed.” Bannon was later pardoned by Trump, in one of the President's final acts in office, but two members of the group indicted with Bannon pled guilty, while the third was convicted.

Publications 
In 2019, he published the book Stealth War: How China Took Over While America's Elite Slept.

In 2022, he published War Without Rules: China's Playbook for Global Domination.

References

1966 births
Living people
Brigadier generals
United States Air Force generals
Trump administration personnel
Hudson Institute
21st-century American writers
California State University, Fresno alumni
University of Missouri alumni
United States air attachés
United States National Security Council staffers